Tennis is the third studio album by British singer-songwriter Chris Rea, released in 1980.

Track listing
All words and music by Chris Rea
 "Tennis" - 5:18
 "Sweet Kiss" - 4:33
 "Since I Don't See You Anymore" - 3:41
 "Dancing Girls" - 4:02
 "No Work Today" (instrumental) - 2:33
 "Every Time I See You Smile" - 6:18
 "For Ever And Ever" - 4:09
 "Good News" - 3:54
 "Friends Across the Water" (instrumental) - 3:45
 "Distant Summers" - 2:10
 "Only With You" - 3:42
 "Stick It" - 5:19

Personnel 
 Chris Rea – lead and backing vocals, grand piano, keyboards, lead guitars, slide guitar, arrangements 
 Graham Watson – keyboards, synthesizers, accordion
 Dave Burton – guitars
 Mick Hutchinson – Fender bass
 Norman Nosebait – drums
 Mark Rea – percussion
 Geoff Driscoll – "every type" of saxophones
 Raphael Ravenscroft – saxophones, brass arrangements 
 Raúl Gonzáles – trombone, bass trombone 
 Lee Thornburg – trumpet, brass arrangements
 Jimmy Chambers – backing vocals
 George Chandler – backing vocals
 Stuart Epps – backing vocals
 Watsoni – backing vocals
 Pete Wingfield – backing vocals

Production 
 Chris Rea – producer 
 Barry Hammond – engineer, mixing 
 Hothouse – artwork
 David Magnus – inner sleeve photography 
 Jim Beach – management 
 John McCoy – management 
 Pendulum Management Ltd. – management company 
 Recorded at Chipping Norton Recording Studios (Oxfordshire, England, UK).

Singles
 "Tennis" b/w "If You Really Love me"
 "Dancing Girls" b/w "Friends Across the Water"

References

Chris Rea albums
1980 albums
Magnet Records albums